Francesco Monachesi (1817 in Macerata – ?)  was an Italian painter, known for his portraits.

His father sent him to study at Rome under Tommaso Minardi, but after his parents died, he was forced to return to Macerata. There he taught at the Scuole Tecniche di Macerata. He is best known for his pen drawings and portraits, including in miniature. At the International Exhibition of Rome, he exhibited: La Concezione, and the Venus of Medici. He also painted in oil and a  portrait dal vero on ivory, and a bust, also exposed at that event. Monachesi.

References

19th-century Italian painters
Italian male painters
1817 births
1910 deaths
People from Macerata
20th-century Italian painters
19th-century Italian male artists
20th-century Italian male artists